The 2000 AFL season was the 104th season of the Australian Football League (AFL), the highest level senior Australian rules football competition in Australia, which was known as the Victorian Football League until 1989.

The season featured sixteen clubs. It ran from 8 March until 2 September, scheduled as the earliest season in history to avoid a clash with the 2000 Summer Olympics in Sydney. The season comprised a 22-game home-and-away season followed by a finals series featuring the top eight clubs.

The premiership was won by the Essendon Football Club for the 16th time, after it defeated  by 60 points in the AFL Grand Final. Essendon lost only one match for the season, its 24–1 season win-loss record standing as the best in the league's history.

Ansett Australia Cup

The 2000 pre-season began with the 2000 Ansett Australia Cup.

Home-and-away season
All starting times are local time. Source: AFL Tables

Round 1

Round 2

Round 3

Round 4

Round 5

Round 6

Round 7

Round 8

Round 9

Round 10

Round 11

Round 12

Round 13

Round 14

Round 15

Round 16

Round 17

Round 18

Round 19

Round 20

Round 21

Round 22

Ladder

Progression by round

Source: AFL Tables

Home matches and membership

Source: AFL Tables

Finals series

Finals week 1

Finals week 2

Finals week 3

Grand final

Win/loss table
The following table can be sorted from biggest winning margin to biggest losing margin for each round. If two or more matches in a round are decided by the same margin, these margins are sorted by percentage (i.e. the lowest-scoring winning team is ranked highest and the lowest-scoring losing team is ranked lowest). Home matches are in bold, and opponents are listed above the margins.

Season notes
  became the first team in VFL/AFL history to win 21 matches in a home-and-away season.
 By winning the grand final, Essendon set a new record for the most wins in a season (24). It also set a new record for the highest average winning margin in a season (51 points).

Awards

Major awards
 The Brownlow Medal was awarded to Shane Woewodin of Melbourne.
 The Coleman Medal was awarded to Matthew Lloyd of Essendon.
 The Norm Smith Medal was awarded to James Hird of Essendon.
 The AFL Rising Star was awarded to Paul Hasleby of Fremantle.
 The wooden spoon was "awarded" to St Kilda.

Leading goalkickers

! rowspan=2 style=width:2em | #
! rowspan=2 | Player
! rowspan=2 | Team
! colspan=22 | Home-and-away season (Coleman Medal)
! colspan=4 | Finals
! rowspan=2 | Total
! rowspan=2 | Games
! rowspan=2 | Average
|-
! 1 !! 2 !! 3 !! 4 !! 5 !! 6 !! 7 !! 8 !! 9 !! 10 !! 11 !! 12 !! 13 !! 14 !! 15 !! 16 !! 17 !! 18 !! 19 !! 20 !! 21 !! 22 !! F1 !! F2 !! F3 !! GF
|-
! scope=row style=text-align:center | 1
| align=left | Matthew Lloyd || align=left |  || bgcolor=C9F0FF | 77 || bgcolor=C9F0FF | 714 || 418 || 422 || 325 || 328 || bgcolor=C9F0FF | 533 || bgcolor=C9F0FF | 538 || bgcolor=C9F0FF | 644 || bgcolor=C9F0FF | 145 || bgcolor=C9F0FF | 752 || bgcolor=C9F0FF | 658 || bgcolor=C9F0FF | 159 || bgcolor=C9F0FF | 463 || bgcolor=C9F0FF | 366 || bgcolor=C9F0FF | 369 || bgcolor=C9F0FF | 473 || bgcolor=C9F0FF | 982 || bgcolor=C9F0FF | 587 || bgcolor=C9F0FF | 188 || bgcolor=C9F0FF | 290 || bgcolor=CCFFCC | 494 || 7101 || X101 || 4105 || 4109 || 109 || 25 || 4.36
|-
! scope=row style=text-align:center | 2
| align=left | Jeff Farmer || align=left |  || 22 || 13 || 36 || 511 || 112 || 416 || 723 || –23 || –23 || 326 || 228 || 129 || 029 || 938 || 745 || 247 || 148 || 452 || 254 || 862 || 062 || 365 || 065 || X65 || 873 || 376 || 76 || 23 || 3.30
|-
! scope=row style=text-align:center | 3
| align=left | Lance Whitnall || align=left |  || 11 || 56 || 511 || 112 || 416 || 420 || 222 || 022 || 022 || 325 || 227 || 330 || 333 || 639 || 645 || 954 || 155 || 560 || 060 || 363 || 063 || 265 || 368 || 270 || 070 ||  || 70 || 25 || 2.80
|-
! scope=row style=text-align:center | 4
| align=left | Wayne Carey || align=left |  || 22 || –2 || 24 || 04 || 37 || 411 || 112 || –12 || 618 || 725 || 126 || 531 || 132 || 537 || 340 || 242 || 547 || 451 || 354 || 458 || 159 || 362 || 163 || 366 || 369 ||  || 69 || 23 || 3.00
|-
! scope=row style=text-align:center | 5
| align=left | Alastair Lynch || align=left |  || –0 || 00 || 44 || 37 || 512 || 214 || 014 || –14 || 418 || 624 || 529 || 332 || 436 || 238 || 341 || 445 || 247 || 249 || 352 || 254 || 357 || 461 || 566 || 268 || colspan=2 |  || 68 || 22 || 3.09
|-
! scope=row style=text-align:center | 6
| align=left | Scott Lucas || align=left |  || –0 || –0 || 22 || 57 || 310 || 616 || 622 || 123 || 124 || 327 || 431 || 031 || 334 || 236 || 137 || 340 || 242 || 547 || 451 || 051 || 051 || 253 || 255 || X55 || 257 || 057 || 57 || 23 || 2.48
|-
! scope=row style=text-align:center | 7
| align=left | Daniel Bradshaw || align=left |  || 44 || 711 || 213 || 316 || 016 || 319 || 019 || 019 || –19 || –19 || –19 || –19 || 726 || 329 || 433 || 437 || 542 || 143 || 548 || 452 || 254 || 256 || 056 || –56 || colspan=2 |  || 56 || 19 || 2.95
|-
! scope=row style=text-align:center rowspan=2 | 8
| align=left | Clive Waterhouse || align=left |  || 22 || 35 || 16 || 28 || 19 || 211 || 213 || 417 || 623 || 124 || 428 || 129 || –29 || 433 || 538 || 038 || 240 || 040 || 242 || 345 || 752 || 153 || colspan=4 |  || 53 || 21 || 2.52
|-
| align=left | Michael O'Loughlin || align=left |  || 55 || 05 || 38 || 08 || 210 || 212 || 012 || 012 || 113 || 114 || 317 || 017 || 522 || 325 || 126 || 430 || 232 || 335 || 641 || 445 || 348 || 553 || colspan=4 |  || 53 || 22 || 2.41
|-
! scope=row style=text-align:center | 10
| align=left | Luke Power || align=left |  || 11 || 12 || 13 || 03 || –3 || 36 || 17 || 18 || 614 || 216 || 319 || 524 || 226 || 228 || 331 || 233 || 134 || 337 || 138 || 341 || 344 || 347 || 552 || –52 || colspan=2 |  || 52 || 22 || 2.36
|-
| colspan=32 | 
|-
! scope=row style=text-align:center | 
| align=left | Peter Everitt || align=left |  || 44 || 913 || bgcolor=C9F0FF | 720 || bgcolor=C9F0FF | 323 || bgcolor=C9F0FF | 528 || bgcolor=C9F0FF | 331 || 031 || 334 || 236 || 036 || 339 || 039 || –39 || –39 || –39 || –39 || –39 || –39 || –39 || 039 || 039 || 140 || colspan=4 |  || 40 || 15 || 2.67
|}

Source: AFL Tables

References

Sources
 2000 season at AFL Tables

2000 Australian Football League season
AFL season
2000